Shen Yang was the ruler of the Kingdom of Henan of the Eighteen Kingdoms during the Chu–Han Contention, an interregnum between the Qin and Hàn dynasties of China.

Shen Yang was from Xiaqiu (瑕丘; present-day Yanzhou District, Jining, Shandong). He was originally a subordinate of Zhang Er, a chancellor of the insurgent Zhao kingdom. After the fall of the Qin dynasty in 206 BC, Xiang Yu divided the former Qin Empire into the Eighteen Kingdoms. Shen Yang was appointed by Xiang Yu as the King of Henan and granted part of the former Hán kingdom's territory as his fief. In 205 BC, Shen Yang surrendered to Liu Bang and his kingdom became the Henan Commandery of the Hàn Empire.

References
 

Chinese nobility
Chu–Han contention people